Elections to Stevenage Council were held on 5 May 2011. One third of the council stood for election; the seats which were last contested in 2007. There were no changes from 2007.

After the election, the composition of the council remained as:
Labour 27
Conservative 9
Liberal Democrat 3

Election result

Ward results

Bandley Hill

Bedwell

Chells

Longmeadow

Manor

Martins Wood

Old Town

Pin Green

Roebuck

Shephall

St Nicholas

Symonds Green

Woodfield

References

2011
2011 English local elections
2010s in Hertfordshire